Rasha Abbas (born 1984 in Latakia, Syria) is a Syrian writer and journalist, best known for The Invention of German Grammar, a collection of short stories in Arabic about her experience as a refugee in Germany. She was a winner of the young writers' award at the 2008 Arab Capital of Culture.

Life and career
Abbas was brought up in Damascus and studied journalism at Damascus University in 2002. While working as an editor at the Syrian state television, she published a collection of short stories, Adam hates TV, for which she won a young writers award at the 2008 Arab Capital of Culture.

When the Syrian civil war started, she joined the anti-government protest movement. A year later, she was forced into exile in Lebanon. In 2014, she won a Jean-Jacques Rousseau fellowship for a three-month residency at the Akademie Schloss Solitude in Stuttgart, Germany. During this time, she published her second book of short stories, The Invention of German Grammar. This fictionalised her experiences of settling in Germany as a refugee, and of learning the German language. The German translation appeared before the Arabic original manuscript. It was later published by the Lebanese office of the Heinrich Böll Foundation and had to be slightly rewritten for Arabic readers.

In 2017, Abbas participated in the Shubbak Literature Festival at the British Library, London. Her presentation, The King of Cups, was based on her research on the cultural and political ramifications of the short-lived union between Syria and Egypt as the United Arab Republic. Her story “You can call me Velvet”, translated by Katharine Halls, was shortlisted for the 2021 ArabLit Story Prize.

Abbas successfully applied for asylum in Germany after her residency in Stuttgart. She currently lives in Schöneberg, Berlin.

Selected works

Articles and stories

Books

References

External links 

 Six Proposals for Participation in a Conversation about Bread, nonfiction by Rasha Abbas, translated by Alice Guthrie

Living people
People from Latakia
1984 births
Syrian emigrants to Germany
Syrian writers